The Mission of Somaliland in Whitechapel, London is the diplomatic mission of the Republic of Somaliland in the United Kingdom. The mission was established in 1991, shortly after Somaliland's unilateral declaration of independence from Somalia.
 
The mission is not a fully-fledged embassy because the British government does not recognise Somaliland as an independent state, instead of viewing it as part of Somalia; however, it is the highest-level representation of the Government of Somaliland in the United Kingdom. It acts largely like any other embassy, issuing visas and Somaliland passports and representing Somalilanders in the UK.

List of representatives

2010-2016: Ali Adan Awale
2016-2019: Ayan Mohamoud Ashour
2019–: Abdi Hersi

See also

 List of representative offices of Somaliland

References

External links

Official site

UK
Somaliland
Foreign relations of Somaliland
Buildings and structures in the London Borough of Tower Hamlets
Whitechapel
Somaliland–United Kingdom relations